Alo is a town and union council of Mardan District in Khyber Pakhtunkhwa province of Pakistan. It is located at 34°26'0N 72°3'0E and has an altitude of 406 metres (1335 feet).

References

Union councils of Mardan District
Populated places in Mardan District